No. 679 Squadron RAF was an anti-aircraft co-operation squadron of the Royal Air Force during the Second World War.

History
No. 679 Squadron was formed on 1 December 1943 at RAF Ipswich, Suffolk, from 1616 and 1627 (anti-aircraft co-operation) Flight for anti-aircraft training duties in East Anglia, and operated upon formation Westland Lysanders, Miles Martinets, Hawker Henleys and Hawker Hurricanes, receiving Fairey Barracudas and Hurricane Mk.IVs in March 1944 and Vultee Vengeances in April 1945. It was disbanded at RAF Ipswich on 26 June 1945.

Aircraft operated

Squadron bases

References

Notes

Bibliography

External links
 History of No. 679 Squadron
 History of No.'s 671–1435 Squadrons at RAF Web

Military units and formations established in 1943
Aircraft squadrons of the Royal Air Force in World War II
Military units and formations disestablished in 1945
679 Squadron